Nuclear power plants operate in 32 countries and generate about a tenth of the world's electricity. 
Most are in Europe, North America, East Asia and South Asia.
The United States is the largest producer of nuclear power, while France has the largest share of electricity generated by nuclear power, at about 70%. 
China has the fastest growing nuclear power programme with 16 new reactors under construction, followed by India, which has 8 under construction.

Some countries operated nuclear reactors in the past but have no operating nuclear plants. 
Among them, Italy closed all of its nuclear stations by 1990 and nuclear power has since been discontinued because of the 1987 referendums.
Kazakhstan is planning to reintroduce nuclear power in the future. Belarus began operating one unit of its first nuclear power plant in June 2021 and expects to bring the second unit into operation in 2022.

Spain and Switzerland are currently operating nuclear power plants while planning nuclear power phase-outs.  Germany will complete the shut down of its nuclear fleet in 2022 and any restart has been ruled out on technical grounds.
Taiwan is considering a phase-out. Austria (Zwentendorf Nuclear Power Plant) and the Philippines (Bataan Nuclear Power Plant) never started to use their first nuclear plants that were completely built.

Sweden and Belgium originally had phase-out policies however they have now moved away from their original plans. The Philippines relaunched their nuclear programme on February 28, 2022 and may soon operate the mothballed Bataan Plant.

Due to financial, political and technical reasons, Cuba, Libya and Poland never completed the construction of their first nuclear plants, and Australia, Azerbaijan, Georgia, Ghana, Ireland, Kuwait, Oman, Peru and Singapore never built their planned first nuclear plants. Some of these countries are still planning to introduce nuclear power. As of 2020, Poland is in advanced planning phase for 1.5 GW and plans to have up to 9 GW by 2040. 
Hong Kong has no nuclear power plants within its boundary, but imports 80% of the electricity generated from Daya Bay Nuclear Power Station located across the border, in which the power company of the territory holds stake. The government had also proposed to increase the share of nuclear energy to 50%. 
In 2021, Iraq declared it plans to build 8 nuclear reactors by 2030 to supply up to 25% electric power in the grid that suffers from shortages.

Overview 

Of the 32 countries in which nuclear power plants operate, only France, Slovakia, Ukraine and Belgium use them as the source for a majority of the country's electricity supply as of 2021. Other countries have significant amounts of nuclear power generation capacity. By far the largest nuclear electricity producers are the United States with 771,638 GWh of nuclear electricity in 2021, followed by China with 383,205 GWh. As of August 2022, 438 reactors with a net capacity of 393,333 MWe are operational, and 57 reactors with net capacity of 58,858 MWe are under construction. Of the reactors under construction, 18 reactors with 18,526 MWe are in China and 8 reactors with a capacity of 6,028 MWe are in India.

See also 
 List of commercial nuclear reactors
 List of nuclear power stations
 Nuclear energy policy by country
 List of nuclear power accidents by country
 List of countries by uranium reserves
 World Nuclear Industry Status Report
 Nuclear industry in Canada

Notes

References

External links 
 World Nuclear Statistics
 2006 statistics in Neutron Physics by Paul Reuss

 
Nuclear technology